Changsha University (CCSU) is located in Changsha, Hunan, central south of China. Changsha University, or Changsha college, is authorized by the Ministry of Education May 2004. Reconstruction and update based on Changsha University status (specialized subject) that is an ordinary undergraduate course in colleges and universities. School was under the condominium by provinces and cities, mainly in Changsha city management system. The central school is located in the historical and cultural city ---- Changsha city, Hunan province.  The school covers an area of 1.326 million square meters and now has two existing campuses. The school construction area is more than 290000 square meters, instruments and equipment for teaching and scientific research value 83.5 million Chinese yuan, the library now houses a collection of 1.18 million books, 13312 full time students.

History
Founded in 1970, Changsha university was upgraded from the original Changsha university (junior college) to an undergraduate college in 2004. Changsha University, located in Changsha, is an undergraduate university granted by the Ministry of Education. On the basis of the former Changsha University (a three-year school), it developed into a new comprehensive university under the direct administration of the Hunan Provincial Government and Changsha Municipal Government. It is currently the only university affiliated with Changsha Municipal Government to enroll students from 15 provinces on a nationwide scale.

Changsha University has 16 departments offering 28 full-time undergraduate degree programs with an enrollment of 12,000 full-time students and 4,800 students taking courses in degree and non-degree programs of adult education.

Campus

Changsha University covers a total area of 1,407,359 square meters with a construction area of over 300,000 square meters. A new campus covering an area of 1,066,000 square meters is still under construction. The university library houses a collection of 825,000 volumes. The university has also built the trunk network of its Campus Computer Networks connected with the International Network and China Education and Research Network. In addition, the university has an affiliated middle school.

Academics

Departments
The school has 16 existing 16 teaching departments, andsave five big disciplines: law, literature, science, engineering, management. Formeda  layout that mainly deveslop engineering and management and multi-discipline coordinated development. Now existing 32 undergraduate programs, 1 specialty construction point of the ministry of education, 1 provincial specialities, 3 provincial characteristic specialty,  2 construction professionals that was provincial funding, 2 provincial professional comprehensive reform pilot project, 1 provincial practice teaching demonstration center, 1 provincial practice teaching demonstration center construction units, 1 university-enterprise cooperation base at the provincial level demonstration base of personnel training, 7 provincial quality courses, 2 provincial teaching team, 4 provincial excellent teaching and research section. School has formed has four provincial "twelfth five-year" key construction disciplines, 2 social science research base in hunan province, 2 science and technology innovation team of Hunan, 1 industry-university-institute cooperation demonstration base, 1 Changsha culture research base, 8 key school-level subjects, 7  key construction disciplines, 3 field of scientific research innovation public platform, 9 nine field innovation teams and cultivating objects, 20 field of research institute pattern of subject construction.

Department of Chinese Language and Journalism

Department of Art

Department of Information and Computing Science

Department of Foreign Languages

Department of Civil Engineering

Department of Bioengineering and Environmental Science

Department of Tourism Management

Department of Computer Science and Technology

Department of Mechanical and Electronic Engineering

Department of Business Administration 

Department of Law and Public Administration

Department of Electronic and Communication Engineering

Department of Extended Education

Department of College English

Department of Physical Education

Faculty
Changsha University enjoys a good reputation for outstanding research facilities and high qualifying teachers and scholars with extensive research interests and profound knowledge. By 2013, the university has 951 full-time faculties, of whom 90 are professors and 193 associate professors, 2 members of young discipline pioneers at provincial level, 29 young faculties enjoying special aid for teaching and academic research from the Education Department of Hunan Province and 4 experts enjoying special allowance from the State Government. Another 8 have won the Zeng Xianzi Prize for model teachers.

Student life

Athletics

Achievement
By focusing on strengthening scientific research, Changsha University commits itself to improving teaching and fostering a growing atmosphere for teachers’ research and innovation. It has set up 5 research institutes, namely Research of Changsha Culture, Research Institute of Higher Education, Research Institute of Mathematics and Research Institute of Biological Technology, and 1 key laboratory of Cell Engineering. Since 2000, the teaching staff have undertaken 2 projects of the State Science Fund and 1 special project of Youth's Fund subsidized by Ministry of Education, published 3,000 treatises in the provincial or national periodicals, 98 of which were quoted by SCI and EI, 23 of which were reprinted by Xinhua Digest, Periodicals of National People's Congress, etc. In May 2005, “Study of Post-war Britain Peaceful Movement”(by Pro.Xiong Weimin ) won State Social Science Fund, together with “Research on Study-oriented Society and Study Innovation and Creativity of College Students”(by Pro.Qu Linyan ) conferred as a key subject of “The 10th 5-Year Plan” of State Education Science in 2003, indicates that the research on humanities and social science in our university has already approached the national level.

Rankings and reputation 
As of 2021, the Best Chinese Universities Ranking, also known as the "Shanghai Ranking", placed the university 360th in China.  Changsha University ranked # 2303 in the world by the University Rankings by Academic Performance 2021-2022.

Admission

Undergraduate students
Applicants of undergraduate programs should have finished senior high school and be at the age of 18-45 and healthy. The study period is four years. The applicant should submit an Application Form, Xerox copies of passport, diploma and transcript for senior high school and the Chinese Proficiency Certificate. The school decides enrollment through evaluation on the applicant's educational background and Chinese proficiency.

The Chinese language requirements for degree students
For liberal arts, economic, trade and managerial studies, the score for the HSK (Chinese Proficiency Test) should be grade 6 or above, for science and technology studies, Grade 3 or above.

Non-degree students
College students who have finished 2 years’ study and want to take relevant courses in China, should be aged 55 or under.

See also
Changsha University of Science and Technology

References

External links

 —Official web site(Chinese Edition)
 —Official web site(English Edition)

Universities and colleges in Hunan
Universities and colleges in Changsha